Jean Piat (23 September 1924 – 18 September 2018) was a French actor and writer.

Life
Piat was born in Lannoy, Nord. He enlisted in the Comédie-Française on 1 September 1947, and became a member on 1 January 1953. He left the Comédie-Française on 31 December 1972, and became an honorary member the following day. He was an officer in the Légion d'honneur and the Ordre des Arts et des Lettres, and a grand officer in the Ordre national du Mérite. He was married to actress Françoise Engel (who died in 2005), and was a professor in the dramatic arts of the Simon Course.

He died on 18 September 2018 at age 93 of heart attack, five days before his 94th birthday.

Theater

Roles in the Comédie-Française
Victor Hugo's Ruy Blas (An usher, Gudiel, an alguazil, Don Manuel Aeias, Don César de Bazan)
Man of LaMancha (Don Quixote)
Edmond Rostand's Cyrano de Bergerac (A guard, Bellerose, a musketeer, Cadet, Brissaille, Jodelet, Cyrano
Pierre Beaumarchais's The Barber of Seville (Figaro)
Molière's The Miser (La Flèche)
Eugène Marin Labiche's The Voyage of Mister Perrichon (Daniel Savary, Joseph)
Pierre de Marivaux's Le Jeu de l'amour et du hasard (Pasquin)
William Shakespeare's Othello (Gentleman)
William Shakespeare's As You Like It (Amiens)
William Shakespeare's Romeo and Juliet (Benvolio)
Molière's Le Bourgeois gentilhomme (Covielle)

Filmography

Acting
1947: Rouletabille joue et gagne as Joseph Rouletabille
1948: The Lame Devil (Le Diable boiteux) as Figaro in The Barber of Seville
1948: Rouletabille contre la dame de pique as Joseph Rouletabille
1951: Clara de Montargis as Jean Claude
1953: The Porter from Maxim's as André de Velin (as Jean Piat sociétaire de la Comédie Française)
1955: Napoléon as Junot (uncredited)
1958: Le bourgeois gentilhomme as Cléonte, amoureux de Lucile
1959: Le mariage de Figaro as Figaro
1961: Les moutons de Panurge as Serge
1967: Lagardère (TV Mini-Series, 6 episodes) as Henri de Lagardère
1968: Der Turm der verbotenen Liebe as Bouridan
1969: The Milky Way (La Voie lactée) as The Jansenist
1970: Rider on the Rain (Le Passager de la pluie) as M. Armand
1972-1973: Les Rois maudits (TV Mini-Series) as Robert d'Artois
1974: La rivale as Pierre
1979: Ciao, les mecs as L'avocat
1999: A Monkey's Tale as Sebastian (voice)
2003: Kaena: The Prophecy as Le grand prêtre (voice)
2007: Go West! A Lucky Luke Adventure as Spike Goodfellow (voice)

Voice acting
Lawrence of Arabia (Thomas Edward Lawrence (Peter O'Toole))
Kaena: The Prophecy (Grand Priest (Gary Martin))
The Lion King (Scar (Jeremy Irons))
The Hunchback of Notre Dame (Judge Claude Frollo (Tony Jay))
The Lord of the Rings: The Fellowship of the Ring (Gandalf the Grey (Ian McKellen))
The Lord of the Rings: The Two Towers (Gandalf the White (Ian McKellen))
The Lord of the Rings: The Return of the King (Gandalf the White (Ian McKellen))
The Golden Compass (Iorek Byrnison (Ian McKellen))
The Hobbit: An Unexpected Journey (Gandalf the Grey (Ian McKellen))
The Hobbit: The Desolation of Smaug (Gandalf the Grey (Ian McKellen))
The Hobbit: The Battle of the Five Armies (Gandalf the Grey (Ian McKellen))

References

External links 
Jean Piat's roles at the Comédie-Française

1924 births
2018 deaths
French male film actors
French male stage actors
Sociétaires of the Comédie-Française
French male voice actors
People from Nord (French department)
French National Academy of Dramatic Arts alumni
Winners of the Prix Broquette-Gonin (literature)
Officiers of the Légion d'honneur
Officiers of the Ordre des Arts et des Lettres
Grand Officers of the Ordre national du Mérite